Naotaka (written: 直孝 or 直隆) is a masculine Japanese given name. Notable people with the name include:

, Japanese daimyō
, Japanese samurai
, Japanese footballer
, Japanese baseball player

Japanese masculine given names